"I Turn to You" is a song by British singer Melanie C. It was released as the fourth single from her debut solo album, Northern Star (1999), on 7 August 2000 in the United Kingdom and became Melanie's second UK number-one single, selling 120,000 copies in its first week. "I Turn to You" also topped the Austrian Singles Chart, the Danish Singles Chart, the Dutch Top 40, the Swedish Singles Chart and the US Billboard Hot Dance Club Play chart. The main single was released as the "Hex Hector Radio Mix", for which Hex Hector won the 2001 Grammy as Remixer of the Year.

Background and recording
The album version of the song was recorded in 1999. It was written by Melanie C, Rick Nowels, and Billy Steinberg. The song was chosen to be released as the fourth single of the album Northern Star, just after the big success of the number one single Never Be The Same Again. According to Melanie C after some discussions with Virgin Records executives, they decided to get some remixes done just to see what they sounded like. She stated that she was "blown away" as soon as she heard the Hex Hector remix, so along with the Virgin executives they decided that it should be released as a single. She said that "it just made sense - the whole Ibiza thing, it was a summer release, it was obvious that the Hex Hector mix was going to be a hit".

Critical reception
Since the song's release, it has been critically acclaimed as one of the best solo Spice Girl singles. Billboard listed it as the number-one entry in the article "Girl Group Solo Songs: The 10 Best (Non-Beyonce) Singles of the Modern Era". Daily Record commented, "Dance orientated, this track looks set to spice up the charts. It's a bit of a change from girl power to power pop." The Digital Fix deemed the song "fantastic". Q magazine said, "Today we are enjoying Ibiza Mel. Video, haircut and moves shamelessly lifted straight from Madonna's Ray of Light. Constant repetition of the titles over some bogstandard techno-fun, and suddenly her Top Shop Motorhead t-shirt is nowhere to be seen. As attempts to dominate the lucrative Ibiza market go, it's innocuous enough, if tinged with fear over what her next move will be". The War Against Silence wrote "the dense, sparkling "I Turn to You" reminds me alternately of recent Roxette and Seven the Hard Way-era Pat Benatar."

Chart performance
With "I Turn to You", Melanie C achieved her tenth number-one UK single as a songwriter and it made her the first woman to top the UK charts as part of a quintet, quartet, duo and as a solo artist. With "Holler", the Spice Girls' final UK number one, Melanie C became the first female songwriter to write at least 11 UK number-one singles. Melanie C held this record alone until Madonna achieved her eleventh number one with "Hung Up" in 2005, then lost it when Madonna achieved her twelfth number one with "Sorry" in 2006.

Music video
The music video for the song was filmed on the island of Ibiza in June 2000, and features shots of her dancing in Es Paradis nightclub. Melanie C has crimped blonde hair extensions in this video and there are constantly changing scenes of her dancing (in Esparadis) to sitting on a cliff to lying in blue water, possibly the sea or a swimming pool. The video ends with her and groups of people walking up the top of the cliff at sunset. The video was directed by Cameron Casey.

Live performances
"I Turn to You" has been performed in all of Melanie C's concert tours, and is typically used as the encore song.

Melanie C performed the song during her appearance on American talk show The Tonight Show with Jay Leno, which aired by NBC on 6 April 2001.
"I Turn to You" eventually became part of the set list for The Return of the Spice Girls tour in 2007 and 2008.

Usage in media
After the song gained popularity, it was featured in the film Bend It Like Beckham. It was covered by Darkseed on "Ultimate Darkness", by Machinae Supremacy on "Webography", and by Wig Wam on 667.. The Neighbour of the Beast. The song was also featured in the musical Viva Forever!, a musical show based on the songs of the Spice Girls. It was featured on the Showtime Unlimited promo.

Track listings

 UK and Taiwanese CD1, South African CD single
 "I Turn to You" 
 "I Turn to You" 
 "Never Be the Same Again" 
 "I Turn to You" 

 UK and Taiwanese CD2
 "I Turn to You" 
 "I Turn to You" 
 "Be the One" 

 UK 12-inch single
A. "I Turn to You"  – 10:13
B. "I Turn to You"  – 10:14

 UK 2×12-inch single
A. "I Turn to You"  – 8:32
B. "I Turn to You"  – 10:29
C. "I Turn to You"  – 6:48
D. "I Turn to You"  – 9:43

 UK cassette single
 "I Turn to You" 
 "Never Be the Same Again" 
 "Be the One" 

 European CD single
 "I Turn to You" 
 "I Turn to You" 

 US maxi-CD single
 "I Turn to You" 
 "I Turn to You" 
 "I Turn to You" 
 "I Turn to You" 

 US 12-inch single
 "I Turn to You"  – 10:29
 "I Turn to You"  – 4:11
 "I Turn to You"  – 8:29

 Australian CD single
 "I Turn to You"  – 4:11
 "I Turn to You"  – 8:32
 "Never Be the Same Again"  – 4:00
 "I Turn to You"  – 10:29
 "I Turn to You"  – 10:13
 "I Turn to You"  – 4:10

Credits and personnel
Credits are taken from the UK CD1 liner notes and the Northern Star album booklet.

Studios
 Recorded at various studios in Los Angeles, London, and Glasgow
 Mixed at O'Henry's Sound Studio (Burbank, California)
 Mastered at Sterling Sound (New York City)

Original personnel
 Melanie Chisholm – writing
 Rick Nowels – writing, production
 Billy Steinberg – writing
 Rob Playford – co-production
 Patrick McCarthy – mixing
 Ted Jensen – mastering

Remix personnel
 Hex Hector – additional production and remix
 Dezrok – keyboards, programming, engineering
 Yak Bondy – vocal reproduction

Charts

Weekly charts

Year-end charts

Decade-end charts

Certifications

Release history

Wig Wam version

"I Turn to You" is the 2004 debut single by Norwegian glam metal band Wig Wam, and the first single released from their debut album 667.. The Neighbour of the Beast. The CD single features only "Crazy Things". The track was later featured on Hard to Be a Rock 'n' Roller, a renamed reissue of 667.. The Neighbour of the Beast.

Track listing

See also
 List of UK Singles Chart number ones of the 2000s
 List of Billboard Hot Dance Music/Club Play number ones of 2000

References

External links
 "I Turn To You" - Melanie C  - Video on YouTube

1999 songs
2000 singles
British dance-pop songs
Dutch Top 40 number-one singles
Grammy Award for Best Remixed Recording, Non-Classical
Melanie C songs
Number-one singles in Austria
Number-one singles in Denmark
Number-one singles in Sweden
Song recordings produced by Rick Nowels
Songs written by Billy Steinberg
Songs written by Melanie C
Songs written by Rick Nowels
Trance songs
UK Singles Chart number-one singles